Jerry Lonecloud (July 4, 1854 – April 16, 1930) was an entertainer, ethnographer and medicine man for the Mi'kmaq people in Nova Scotia.  His oral memoirs, recorded from 1923 to 1929, which included Mi'kmaw oral histories and legends, were compiled into a 2002 book—Tracking Dr. Lonecloud: Showman to Legend Keeper—by ethnographer and historian, Ruth Holmes Whitehead at the Nova Scotia Museum in Halifax. Because these recordings form the basis of the 2002 biography, it is considered to be the first Mi'kmaq memoir  Whitehead wrote that, "ethnographer of the Micmac nation could rightly have been his epitaph, his final honour."

Early life
Jerry Lonecloud's Mi'kmaw parents, who were originally from Nova Scotia, were living in Belfast, Maine when he was born on 4 July 1852. His parents shared their knowledge of traditional medicine with him when he was young. He kept his birth name—Germain Bartlett Alexis—until he began his career as a showman in the 1880s, when he was in his thirties. He lived for awhile in Vermont. By 1868, when he was 14 years-old, after both his parents had died, he began a two-year search to find his brother and his two sisters to return with them to Nova Scotia.

Dr. Lonecloud
He adopted the name Dr. Lonecloud in the 1890s while working in Medicine Shows and Wild West shows, including John Healy and Charles Bigelow's Kickapoo Indian medicine, Buffalo Bill Cody's Wild West Show and the Kiowa Medicine Show.

Ethnographer

Lonechild's work as ethnographer and archivist has been recorded in his biography, co-authored by ethnographer and historian Ruth Holmes Whitehead, journalist Clara Dennis, and Lonechild. Dennis's interviews with Lonecloud, recorded between 1923 and 1929—near the end of his life—form the basis of the biography. All three are credited as co-authors. The 1920s recordings with Dennis include Mi'kmaw legends, oral histories, jokes and social customs" many of which had not been published prior to the 2002 biography.

As an ethnographer he worked extensively with historian and archivist Harry Piers.

Personal life
He and his family were living at Tufts Cove in Dartmouth during the Halifax Explosion on December 6, 1917.  Two of his daughters were killed and he lost an eye.

He died in Halifax on April 16, 1930.

Legacy 
 Namesake of musical group Lone Cloud
 Namesake of Lone Cloud Island (site of former Scouts Camp) in Fall River, Nova Scotia 
Namesake of Jerry Lonecloud Trail in Cole Harbour, Nova Scotia
 A display in the Nova Scotia Museum of Natural History

External links 
 Jason Price. ‘The best remedy ever offered to the public’:Representation and Resistance in the American Medicine Show. Popular Entertainment Studies, Vol 2, No 2 (2011)

References 

1854 births
1930 deaths
19th-century First Nations people
20th-century First Nations people
Canadian people with disabilities
Folk healers
Indigenous leaders in Atlantic Canada
Mi'kmaq people
People from Dartmouth, Nova Scotia